The Chamberlain Ranger Station Historic District, also known as the Chamberlain Guard Station, is located in the Frank Church-River of No Return Wilderness within Payette National Forest in Idaho County, Idaho.  It was listed on the National Register of Historic Places in 2004.

The listing was for a  area which included four contributing buildings and two contributing sites.  The station's residence was built during 1937 to 1938.  It is a one-and-a-half-story  log building on a concrete and rock masonry foundation, based on a USFS Standard Plan model R-4 #53-c.  Its walls are peeled lodgepole pine logs from trees cut on the site.  Its corners are saddle-notched.

Other structures include one built during the first decade of the 20th century, moved to the site in 1954, and another built c.1921.

References

Historic districts on the National Register of Historic Places in Idaho
Buildings and structures completed in 1921
Idaho County, Idaho
Ranger stations in Idaho